Scopus is a rural locality in the local government area (LGA) of Circular Head in the North-west and west LGA region of Tasmania. The 2016 census recorded a population of 48 for the state suburb of Scopus.

History 
Scopus was gazetted as a locality in 1973. It is believed that the name comes from Mount Scopus in Jerusalem.

Geography
The waters of inlets of Bass Strait form much of the northern and eastern boundaries.

Road infrastructure 
Route C215 (Montagu Road) runs through from east to north-west.

References

Towns in Tasmania
Localities of Circular Head Council